Ferdinand Franz Wallraf (20 July 1748 - 18 March 1824) was a German botanist, mathematician, theologian, art collector and Roman Catholic priest. His collection formed the founding nucleus of the Wallraf–Richartz Museum.

Biography 
He was the son of a Master tailor. He had no money to continue his higher education so, having received minor orders in 1763, he became a teacher. In 1772, he was ordained a priest by Auxiliary Bishop . Beginning in 1776 his friend, the Professor and physician, Johann Georg Menn (1730-1781), helped him study medicine. He obtained his Baccalauréat in 1778, and his Master's in 1780. 
  
In 1784, the  awarded him a professorship and he became a Canon at St. Maria im Kapitol. As early as 1785, he was commissioned to improve the school and university system, but nothing was achieved due to inaction by the city government. By 1788, he was a Doctor of medicine and philosophy. In 1795, he was also made a Canon at the Basilica of the Holy Apostles. From 1793 to 1796. he served as a Rector at the Universitas. He used his own resources to restore the botanical gardens on the Zeughausstraße for research purposes.
 
When the Universitas was abolished by the French in 1798, during their occupation of the Left Bank of the Rhine, Wallraf became a teacher at its successor, the short-lived University of Cologne, in ine department of Belles Lettres. Although he swore an oath to the university, he refused to swear one to the First Republic. He was also named the "Conservateur des monuments". It was then that he began his own collecting in earnest; meant to eventually restore that of the Universitas. His collection included Roman excavation pieces, various medieval paintings, religious works of art, manuscripts and early prints, coins, fossils, historical weapons and sculptures.

In 1809, in his capacity as Conservateur, he was commissioned to design the new Melaten cemetery, using the Père Lachaise cemetery in Paris as a model. His plans included a recreational area and a green commons. That same year, together with his fellow teacher Johann Caspar Schug (1766–1818), he founded the "Olympic Society", devoted to cultivating art and literature, as well as preserving Cologne's unique dialect and humor.

In 1812, Mayor  passed along an order from the French government, engaging Wallraf to propose new, French names for the streets of Cologne. If possible, he was to use cognates from Old High German and Middle High German. To achieve this, he held frequent consultations with the printer and publisher, who offered many helpful suggestions. He also took the opportunity to change mildly offensive names. For example; "Pißgasse" became "Passage de la Bourse". (Börsengässche). House numbering was reorganized according to the directions of General , to make addresses more logically sequential. In 1813, Thiriart published the first Street Directory in French; the Itinéraire de Cologne.

He died in 1824 and was buried at the cemetery he had designed. The work of cataloguing his collection took almost two years. It was exhibited from 1827 to 1860 in what was known as the "Wallrafianum". Several museums in Cologne later drew on his collection to begin their own. The largest part is now at the Wallraf–Richartz Museum. His manuscripts are preserved at the city's Historical Archives.

References

Further reading 
 Wilhelm Smets: Ferdinand Franz Wallraf. Ein biographisch-panegyrischer Versuch. DuMont-Schauberg, Köln 1825
 
 Joachim Deeters (ed.): Franz Ferdinand Wallraf. Ausstellung des Historischen Archivs der Stadt Köln; 5. Dezember 1974 bis 31. Januar 1975. Historisches Archiv der Stadt Köln, Köln 1974.
 Bianca Thierhoff: Ferdinand Franz Wallraf, 1748–1824. Eine Gemäldesammlung für Köln. Kölnisches Stadtmuseum, Cologne 1997.
 Götz Czymmek: Ferdinand Franz Wallraf im Bild. In: Wallraf-Richartz-Jahrbuch 69, 2008, S. 271–302
 Klaus Müller: Ferdinand Franz Wallraf. Gelehrter, Sammler, Kölner Ehrenbürger 1748–1824. Hg. Historische Gesellschaft Köln. Greven, Köln 2017 
 Elisabeth Schläwe, Sebastian Schlinkheider: Letzter Wille mit großer Wirkung – Die Testamente Ferdinand Franz Wallrafs (1748–1824). In mapublishing-lab. 2018, retrieved 3 July 2018 (Online-Publikation zu Wallrafs drei Testamenten mit umfangreichem Quellenmaterial).
 
 Johanna Schopenhauer: Ausflug an den Niederrhein und nach Belgien im Jahr 1828, im Kapitel "Wallraf und sein Museum" findet man eine gute Zusammenfassung seines Lebens
 Ferdinand Franz Wallraf. In: Neuer Nekrolog der Deutschen, 2. Jahrgang, 1824, 2. Teil. Ilmenau 1826. S. 588 f.

External links 

 
 
 Von Wallraf gesammelte Handschriften im Digitalen Historischen Archiv Köln
 Weitere digitalisierte Archivbestände zu Ferdinand Franz Wallraf im Digitalen Historischen Archiv Köln
 Die Bibliothek Wallraf in der Universitäts- und Stadtbibliothek Köln
 Google Books:   Beiträge zur Geschichte der Stadt Köln und ihrer Umgebungen Von Ferdinand Franz Wallraf, Verlag M. DuMont-Schauberg, Köln 1818
 Das Projekt Wallraf digital am Lehrstuhl für Geschichte der Frühen Neuzeit der Universität zu Köln

1748 births
1824 deaths
Clergy from Cologne
19th-century German Roman Catholic priests
19th-century German botanists
18th-century art collectors
19th-century art collectors
German art collectors
18th-century German mathematicians
19th-century German mathematicians
18th-century German Catholic theologians
19th-century German Catholic theologians
Rectors of the University of Cologne
Scientists from Cologne
18th-century German botanists